Chemnitz Küchwald station (until December 2018 Küchwald) is located in the district of Furth in Chemnitz, Saxony, Germany on the Neukieritzsch–Chemnitz railway. It is an important station to supply the Chemnitz Nord co-generation power station with fuels.

History 
The station was opened in 1902. Here the Wechselburg–Küchwald railway, the Küchwald–Obergrüna railway and the line to Hilbersdorf marshalling yard branched off. The line to Obergrüna was closed in 2004, the line to Wechselburg in 2002.

The station has always been passed by passenger trains as there were no platforms until late 2018. A platform for passenger transport was commissioned an 5 December 2018.  The platform is located on the right and used for passenger trains in both directions.

Operation 
The station is destination for coal, lime, mineral oil and empty gypsum trains. After their arrival they will be separated and shunted to the station of the power plant in Furth by shunters of DB Class V60, DR Class V60 and DR Class V 23.

References

External links 
 

Rail freight transport in Germany
Railway stations in Chemnitz
Buildings and structures completed in 1902